Manoj Chitnavis FRSC is a British teacher and chemist.

Education 
Chitnavis arrived in the UK from Uganda in 1972, and settled in Devon.  He studied chemistry and biology at the University of Plymouth from 1985 and was later appointed as a research assistant in environmental sciences there.

Career

He subsequently started at Exeter School as a teacher in chemistry, biology and physics, where he maintained links with research,  later also becoming a careers advisor.
In 2009 he was appointed as chair of the UK Association for Science Education, a body for connecting industry, business and research with science education. In October 2011, he was made an honorary Fellow of the Royal Society of Chemistry.

References

British chemists
Schoolteachers from Devon
Alumni of the University of Plymouth
Fellows of the Royal Society of Chemistry
Living people
Year of birth missing (living people)
Place of birth missing (living people)
Ugandan emigrants to the United Kingdom